Mohra Noori is a town in the Rawalpindi District of Punjab province, Pakistan.

Administration
Mohra Nooris is also the principal town of Mohra Noori Union council which is one of the 33 Union Councils (i.e. subdivisions) of Gujar Khan Tehsil.

References

Populated places in Gujar Khan Tehsil
Union councils of Gujar Khan Tehsil
Towns in Gujar Khan Tehsil